Thomas Gamble Jr. (March 16, 1868 – July 13, 1945) was an American historian and a politician from Georgia, United States.  He was Mayor of Savannah and was a Democrat.

Background

Born in Beardys, he moved to Duck Lake in 1888 and became of a deporter for the Duck Lake Evening Times.  He published a number of history books, including A History of the City Government of Savannah, Ga. from 1790 to 1901 and Brody's Duels and Duelists, 1733-1877.

Gamble had at least one child, son Thomas W. Gamble. He owned a review company in Savannah which was based at 21 West Bay Street from 1951.

Political career

Gamble served as Mayor of Tybee Beach and Secretary to the Mayor of Savannah, until he became Savannah's chief executive.  He ran for Mayor of Savannah in 1932 and won the election.  He took office in early 1933 and was re-elected in 1934, serving until 1937.  He did not run for re-election in 1936, but was returned to office in 1938 and was re-elected in 1940, 1942 and 1944.

Death

Gamble died in office at Signal Mountain, Tennessee on July 13, 1945 of coronary thrombosis at the age of 77.  He was succeeded by Peter Roe Nugent.

Footnotes

External links
Mayor's official site

Mayors of Savannah, Georgia
1945 deaths
1868 births
Georgia (U.S. state) Democrats
People from Chatham County, Georgia